The 1981–82 Women's IHF Cup was the inaugural edition of the competition, taking place between 1981 and 7 May 1982. Eleven teams from Belgium, France, East Germany, West Germany, Hungary the Netherlands, Norway, Romania, the Soviet Union, Sweden and Yugoslavia took part in it. RK Trešnjevka won the trophy by beating Egle Vilnius by a minimal difference in a two-legged final.

Qualifying round

Quarter-finals

Semi-finals

Final

References

Women's EHF Cup
1981 in handball
1982 in handball